KINZ (95.3 FM) is a radio station broadcasting a classic hits & classic rock format. Licensed to Humboldt, Kansas, United States, it serves the Chanute area.  The station is currently owned by My Town Media. Studios are located on North Plummer Avenue in Chanute, while its transmitter is located northwest of Chanute.

KINZ is an affiliate of the syndicated Pink Floyd program "Floydian Slip."

External links

INZ
Classic hits radio stations in the United States
Classic rock radio stations in the United States
Radio stations established in 1985
1985 establishments in Kansas